Ballı (formerly Eleksi)  is a village in Mut district of Mersin Province, Turkey. Population of Ballı was 462as of 2011. as of 2011. It is a high altitude and rather secluded village with insufficient farming land. Main economic activity is animal breeding. But cereals and apple are also produced.

References

Villages in Mut District